Isotonitazene is a benzimidazole derived opioid analgesic drug related to etonitazene, which has been sold as a designer drug. It has only around half the potency of etonitazene in animal studies,  but it is likely even less potent in humans as was seen with etonitazene (1000 times as potent as morphine in animal models yet only 60 times as potent in humans). Isotonitazene (obtained from an online vendor) was fully characterized in November 2019 in a paper where the authors performed a full analytical structure elucidation in addition to determination of the potency at the μ-opioid receptor using a biological functional assay in vitro. While isotonitazene was not compared directly to morphine in this assay, it was found to be around 2.5 times more potent than hydromorphone and slightly more potent than fentanyl.

Side effects 

Side effects of benzimidazole derived opioids are likely to be similar to those of fentanyl, which include itching, nausea and potentially serious respiratory depression, which can be life-threatening. 

Isotonitazene has been detected in multiple fatalities in Europe since March 2019 and in the U.S. since August 2019, as reported by NPS Discovery, the Center for Forensic Science Research and Education, and NMS Labs.

Legal status 

The US Drug Enforcement Administration issued a notice of intent to publish a temporary order to schedule isotonitazene in Schedule I of the Controlled Substances Act, which came into effect on 20 August 2020.

See also 
 BIM-018
 Clonitazene
 Metonitazene
 Etonitazene
 Etonitazepyne
 Etazen

References 

Analgesics
Abandoned drugs
Designer drugs
Benzimidazole opioids
Diethylamino compounds